Bret Mulder (born 6 February 1964) is an Australian former cricketer.

Mulder made his debut for Western Australia in 1983. He played 14 times for WA until 1987. He returned to the state team in 1997, playing another 11 matches until 1998.

Mulder is assistant coach of the Denmark national cricket team.

References

1964 births
Living people
Australian cricketers
Western Australia cricketers
Australian cricket coaches
Sportsmen from Western Australia
Cricketers from Perth, Western Australia